St. Grigor Church was an Armenian church located in the village of Gomur (Shahbuz District) of the Nakhchivan Autonomous Republic of Azerbaijan. It was located atop high ground in the center of the village.

History 
The church was founded in the 12th or 13th century and was renovated in the 17th century.

Architecture 
The basilica-style church consisted of a single nave, two aisles, two vestries, and a hall, with decorated doorways in the west and south. There were two khachkars with relief decorations on the western. There were Armenian inscriptions on the western and southern facades.

Destruction 
The church was in a well-preserved condition in the late Soviet period. It was listed on the 1988 list of Historical and Cultural Monuments of the Azerbaijan SSR under inventory number 2856. However, it was destroyed at some point between 1997 and November 11, 2009, as documented by Caucasus Heritage Watch.

References 

Armenian churches in Azerbaijan
Ruins in Azerbaijan